The Fada N’Gourma shooting occurred on 7 August 2020. At least 20 people were killed when an unidentified gunmen attacked a cattle market in Fada N’Gourma, Gourma Province, Est Region, Burkina Faso.

See also
2019 Fada N’Gourma attack

References

2020 mass shootings in Africa
2020 murders in Burkina Faso
21st-century mass murder in Burkina Faso
Mass murder in 2020
Mass shootings in Burkina Faso
Terrorist incidents in Africa in 2020

Jihadist insurgency in Burkina Faso